Ji Binchang (born November 1963) is a former Chinese executive and politician. He was investigated by China's top anti-graft agency in January 2023. Previously he served as chairman of the Qingdao Municipal Committee of the Chinese People's Political Consultative Conference and before that, vice governor of Shandong.

He was a representative of the 19th National Congress of the Chinese Communist Party.

Early life and education
Ji was born in Changyi County (now Changyi), Shandong, in November 1963, and graduated from the Department of National Economic Management, Sichuan University in 1986.

Political career
Ji joined the Chinese Communist Party (CCP) in October 1985, and began his political career in July 1986, when he was assigned to the Shandong Provincial Economic System Reform Office after university. He rose to become deputy director in September 2000.

He was deputy director of the State owned Assets Supervision and Administration Commission of Shandong Provincial People's Government in May 2004, and held that office until March 2013.

He was chairman of Shandong Luxin Investment Holding Group Co., Ltd. in March, in addition to serving as party secretary. 

He was director of the Shandong Provincial Economic and Information Commission in July 2018 and subsequently director of the Shandong Provincial Department of Industry and Information Technology three months later.

In June 2020, he was elevated to vice governor of Shandong, a post he kept until March 2022, when he was transferred to Qingdao and appointed chairman of the Qingdao Municipal Committee of the Chinese People's Political Consultative Conference.

Downfall
On 6 January 2023, he has been placed under investigation for "serious violations of laws and regulations" by the Central Commission for Discipline Inspection (CCDI), the party's internal disciplinary body, and the National Supervisory Commission, the highest anti-corruption agency of China.

References

1963 births
Living people
People from Changyi
Sichuan University alumni
People's Republic of China politicians from Shandong
Chinese Communist Party politicians from Shandong